Leonard "Leon" Coleman (born September 1, 1944, in Alabama) is an American hurdler who competed in the 1968 Summer Olympics.

July 1982 Coleman competed in the Masters So Cal Track and Field Championship meet and won the M35 hurdles race;  And, August 1983 winning the Masters West Region meet in the high hurdles.

References

1944 births
Living people
American male hurdlers
Olympic track and field athletes of the United States
Athletes (track and field) at the 1968 Summer Olympics
Masters athletes
American masters athletes